Lovewell State Park is a state park in Jewell County, Kansas, United States.  It is located near the city of Webber.  Established in 1967, the  state park features utility camping, cabins and a beach. The park has access to Lovewell Reservoir.

See also
 List of Kansas state parks
 List of lakes, reservoirs, and dams in Kansas
 List of rivers of Kansas

References

External links

State parks of Kansas
Protected areas of Jewell County, Kansas
Protected areas established in 1967